The Oracle is a 1979 Australian TV series that aired on ABC TV about a talkback radio announcer.

There was a controversial episode which featured a scene where a baby was killed.

Cast
John Gregg
Pamela Gibbons
Julie Hamilton

Episodes
Incest to Income Tax (aired 12 March 1979)
A Smack in the Mouth (aired 19 March 1979)
All That's Left of the Song (aired 26 March 1979)
Everything's Coming Up Roses (aired 2 April 1979)
You & the Night & the Muzak (aired 9 April 1979)
Time Wounds All Heels (aired 16 April 1979)
Six O'Clock High (aired 23 April 1979)
Win a Few, Lose a Few (aired 30 April 1979)
Take a Side, Any Side (aired 7 May 1979)
Fresh out of Miracles (aired 14 May 1979)
Black on the Line (aired 21 May 1979)
Live from Las Vegas (aired 28 May 1979)

References

External links
The Oracle at Austlit
The Oracle at IMDb
The Oracle at National Film and Sound Archive

1979 Australian television series debuts
Australian Broadcasting Corporation original programming
Australian drama television series
English-language television shows